Trigonopterus micans is a species of flightless weevil in the genus Trigonopterus from Indonesia.

Etymology
The specific name is derived from the Latin word micans, meaning "shining".  It refers to the species' metallic luster.

Description
Individuals measure 2.20–2.97 mm in length.  General coloration is dark rust-colored or black, with rust-colored legs and antennae and reddish-coppery coloration on the pronotum and elytra.

Range

Phylogeny
T. micans is part of the T. dimorphus species group.

References

micans
Beetles described in 2014
Beetles of Asia
Insects of Indonesia